Coleophora arkaimella is a moth of the family Coleophoridae. It is found in the southern Ural Mountains in  Russia.

The wingspan is 14-15.5 mm. Adults have a light brown thorax and head light brown. The forewings are beige, suffused with pale buff and dark brown scales. The stripes are white and the fringes beige. The hindwings and fringes are brown.

Etymology
The name of the taxon alludes to the Arkaim reserve, where the first specimens were discovered.

References

arkaimella
Moths described in 2007
Moths of Europe